Jena is a surname in India. 

Bijaya Jena, Indian actress, film director and producer
Bhanu Pratap Jena (born 1955), American cell biologist
Mohan Jena (born 1957), Indian politician
Srikant Kumar Jena (born 1950), Indian politician
Surendra Nath Jena, Indian Odissi dancer

See also 
 Odia surnames